The Leyden manuscript (Dornskrid Leiden) is the name usually given in Breton studies to a four-page leaflet ("bifolio") kept in the library of Leiden University in the Netherlands (shelfmark:  folio 96 A). It is a fragment of a Latin medical treatise dating from the 9th or late 8th century in which two Irish words appear and about thirty Old Breton words.

Description

Pierre-Yves Lambert thus describes the place held by Breton in this text:
Vossianus lat. 96 A has the peculiarity of including Old Breton not in the glosses, but in the main text: it is one of the few documents where the vernacular language is not restricted to secondary use. Nevertheless, Old Breton only intervenes on one page of this bifolio and there it remains subordinate to Latin insofar as it is simply technical words (names of plants, preparations) which are substituted for the corresponding Latin words.

From a literary point of view, he adds:
Leiden's medical fragment is doubtless not typically Breton in the subject: it is a question of ancient or medieval Latin recipes that are constantly being copied in monasteries.

Some examples of the Breton words found in the manuscript:
 : apple
 : branch
 : search
 : holly
 : oak
 : alder tree
 : mistletoe
 : head
 : elder tree
 : thorn (hawthorn, plum tree)

Sources 
  [This article contains a transcription of the manuscript (pp. 18-21) followed by a glossary (pp. 21–25).]

External links 
 Original and French translation

9th-century manuscripts
Breton language
Manuscripts of Leiden University Library
Medical manuscripts